Anıl Karaer (born 4 July 1988) is a Turkish footballer who plays as defender. He has been trained by the Galatasaray youth department.

On 24 June 2009, he signed a two-year contract with Adanaspor.

References

External links
 
 
 

1988 births
Footballers from Istanbul
Living people
Turkish footballers
Turkey under-21 international footballers
Turkey youth international footballers
Galatasaray S.K. footballers
Çaykur Rizespor footballers
MKE Ankaragücü footballers
Manisaspor footballers
Adanaspor footballers
Kardemir Karabükspor footballers
Ankaraspor footballers
Bursaspor footballers
Adana Demirspor footballers
Tuzlaspor players
Süper Lig players
TFF First League players
Association football defenders